Grand Ayatollah Sayyid Hossein Ali Tababataei Borujerdi (Luri/; 23 March 1875 – 30 March 1961) was a leading Iranian Shia Marja' in Iran from approximately 1947 to his death in 1961.

Life
Borujerdi was born on 23 March 1875 in the city of Borujerd in Lorestan Province in Iran. His family traced its lineage 30 generations to Hassan ibn Ali (the grand son of the Prophet Muhammad). 
His father Sayyid Ali Tabataba'i was a religious scholar in Borujerd and his mother, Sayyidah Agha Beygum, was the daughter of Sayyid Mohammad Ali Tabataba'i.

Tenure as Ayatollah and Marja
Borujerdi revived the hawza of Qom in 1945 (1364 AH), which had waned after the death of its founder Abdul-Karim Ha'eri Yazdi in 1937. When Sayyid Abul Hasan Isfahani died the following year, the majority of Shi'a accepted Ayatullah Borujerdi as Marja'. Scholar Roy Mottahedeh reports that Borujerdi was the sole marja "in the Shia world" from 1945-6 until his death in 1961.

Outreach in the Islamic world
Borujerdi was praised by Morteza Motahhari for attempting to bridge the gap between Sunnis and Shiites. Borujerdi sent representatives to Lebanon, Kuwait, Sudan and Pakistan. He also helped establish the Islamic Center of Hamburg. Borujerdi also sent missionaries to spread Islam in Europe and the United States.

He established cordial relations with Mahmud Shaltut, the grand Shaykh of Al-Azhar University. Together, the two scholars established the "Organization for Rapprochement Among the Islamic Sects" ( Dar al-Taqrib bayn al-Madhahib al-lslamiyyah) in Cairo. Shaltut issued a famous fatwa legitimizing Ja'fari school of jurisprudence on par with the four major Sunni legal schools, and promoted its teaching at Al-Azhar.

Permission for narrating Hadith
Borujerdi was authorized as a Mujtahid by his teachers, which included Akhund Khurasani, Shaykh al-Shari'ah Isfahani and Sayyid Abu al-Qasim Dihkurdi. He was also given the permission of narrating Hadith by Akhund Khurasani, Shaykh al-Shari'ah Isfahani, Shaykh Muhammad Taqi Isfahani known as Aqa Najafi Isfahani, Sayyid Abu al-Qasim Dihkurdi, Agha Buzurg Tihrani and 'Alam al-Huda Malayiri.

Teaching Method
Borujerdi used a simple language in his lessons and avoided unnecessary extra discussions. Like early Shi'a 'ulama such as Shaykh al-Mufid and Sayyid Murtada, Shaykh al-Tusi, Shaykh Tabarsi and Allamah Bahr al-'Ulum, he had a comprehensive knowledge of different Islamic studies. He also studied jurisprudential verdicts of Shi'a and Sunni faqihs of the past.
He had a unique method in ‘Ilm al-rijal by studying the chain of narrators of hadiths in the Four Books independently from narrations. Through this method, he made great contributions to later research.

Political leanings
Unlike many clergy and temporal rulers, Borujerdi and Shah Mohammad Reza Pahlavi, are said to have had cordial and mutually beneficial relations, starting with a visit by the Shah to Borujerdi's hospital room in 1944. Borujerdi is said to have generally remained aloof from politics and given the Shah his "tacit support," while the Shah did not follow his father's harsh anti-clericalism (for example he exempted clergy from military service), and until Borujerdi's death occasionally visited the cleric.

Borujerdi's belief in quietism, or silence of state matters, extended to keeping silent in public on such issues as Israel's treatment of the Palestinians, the overthrow of Mohammad Mosaddegh and the end of his campaign to nationalize and control the British-owned oil industry in Iran, and the Baghdad Pact alliance with the US and UK. It is thought that as a reward for this support the Shah ensured more religious instruction in state schools, tightened control of cinemas and other offensive secular entertainment during Moharram.

Ayatollah Borujerdi passively opposed the Pahlavi regime's agrarian reforms, which he called "agrarian destruction." In his view, the confiscations of large concentrations of landholdings of aristocrats and clergy by the Pahlavi shahs disrupted the fabric of rural life and eroded religious institutions.

Ruhollah Khomeini, who would lead the Iranian people's revolution in 1979, was Borujerdi's pupil. Borujerdi forbade Khomeini to take part in political activities, a ban which ended with Borujerdi's death.

Pepsi fatwa
In 1955 Borujerdi issued a fatwa making Pepsi Cola illegal in Iran. According to Ruhollah Khomeini, this was because the Pepsi franchise in Iran was held by Habib Sabet, a Baháʼí.

Death

Borujerdi died in Qom on 30 March 1961. The Shah proclaimed three days of mourning and attended a memorial service in his honor.

Personal life and Education

Family
Borujerdi had two sons and three daughters from his first wife, all but one of whom died in childhood. The one who survived, died due to a difficult giving birth two years after marriage.

He had two sons and two daughters from his second wife (the daughter of Hajj Muhammad Ja'far Roughani Isfahani).

His third wife was his cousin, the daughter of Sayyid ‘Abd al-Wahid Tabataba'i.

Children
 One of his sons, Sayyid Muhammad Hasan Tabataba'i Burujirdi was born in 1925 in Burujird; he was in charge of writing the official verdicts of his father. He died in 1977 in Qom.
 Sayyid Ahmad Tabataba'i was born in 1937 in Burujird and died in Qom at the age of 19.
 Agha Fatemeh Ahmadi Tabataba'i, his older daughter and the wife of Sayyid Ja'far Ahmadi. She died in 1993 at the age of 80.
 Agha Sakina Ahmadi, his second daughter was born in 1933 and was the wife of Sayyid Muhammad Husayn ‘Alawi Tabataba'i.

Education and academic specialties
After entering elementary school at the age of seven, Sayyid Husayn's father realized his talent for learning and sent him to Nurbakhsh seminary in Borujerd.
At the age of 11 he began his education at the theological schools of his city, under his father Sayed Ali. Then in 1310 (1892–93) he attended the theological school of Isfahan to continue his education. In the ten years that he studied in Isfahan, he completed his sutuh studies and was also granted the level of Ijtihad from his teachers, and began teaching Usul. Around the age of 30, Burujerdi moved from Isfahan to the theological seminary of Najaf, Iraq to continue his education.

In his youth, Borujerdi studied under a number of Shia masters of fiqh such as Mohammad-Kazem Khorasani and Aqa Zia Iraqi, and specialized in fiqh. He studied the fiqahat of all the Islamic schools of thought, not just his own, along with the science of rijal. Though he is known for citing Masumeen to support many of his deductions, Borujerdi is known for elucidating many aspects himself and is an influential fiqh jurist in his own right. He has had a strong influence on Islamic scholars like Morteza Motahhari and Hussein-Ali Montazeri.

Notable students
Ruhollah Khomeini
Mohammad-Reza Golpaygani
Hossein Vahid Khorasani
Hussein-Ali Montazeri
Sayed Ali Khamenei
Sayyid Ali al-Sistani
Lotfollah Safi Golpaygani
Ali Safi Golpaygani
Mohammad Fazel Lankarani
Dr. Seyed Ali Mirlohi Falavarjani
Mousa Shubairi Zanjani
Karamatollah Malek-Hosseini
Muhammad Taha al-Huwayzi

Works authored

Arabic books
Jami' ahadith al-shi'a (31 vol)
Sirat al-nijat
Tartib asanid man la yahduruh al-faqih
Tartib Rijal asanid man la yahduruh al-faqih
Tartib asanid amali al-saduq
Tartib asanid al-Khisal
Tartib asanid 'ilal al-sharayi'
Tartib asanid tahdhib al-ahkam
Tartib rijal asanid al-tahdhib
Tartib asanid thawab al-a'mal wa 'iqab al-a'mal
Tartib asanid 'idah kutub
Tartib rijal al-Tusi
Tartib asanid Rijal al-Kashshi
Tartib asanid rijal al-najjashi
Tartib rijal al-fihristayan
Buyut al-shi'a
Hashiyah 'ala rijal al-najjashi
Hashiyah 'ala 'umdat al-talib fi ansab al abi talib
Hashiyah 'ala manhaj al-maqal
Hashiyah 'ala wasa'il al-shi'a
Al-mahdi (a) fi kutub ahl al-sunnah
Al-athar al-manzumah
Hashiyah 'ala majma' al-masa'l
Majma' al-furu'
Hashiyah 'ala tabsirah al-muta'allimin
Anis al-muqalladin

Persian Books
Tudih al-manasik
Tudih al-masa'l
Manasik haj

See also
Marja'
List of Islamic studies scholars

References

External links
 Biography of Borujerdi

People from Borujerd
1875 births
1961 deaths
Iranian grand ayatollahs
People from Lorestan Province
Pupils of Muhammad Kadhim Khorasani
Burials at Fatima Masumeh Shrine